Lugonjo is a neighborhood in Entebbe Municipality, Busiro County, Wakiso District, in the Buganda Region of Uganda.

Location
Lugonjo is bordered by Nakiwogo to the north, Kiwafu to the east and the Kampala-Entebbe Road to the southeast. Kiwafu Road forms Lugonjo's eastern boundary, stretching from Nakiwogo to the north, to Kampala-Entebbe Road to the south.

A papyrus marsh separates the neighborhood from Entebbe International Airport. The same swampy marsh separates Lugonjo from an inlet of Lake Victoria to the west.

The geographical coordinates of Lugonjo are: 00°03'57.0"N, 32°27'07.0"E (Latitude:0.065833; Longitude:32.451944).

Overview
The neighborhood is low-income residential and business area. It s characterized by places of entertainment that are open 24 hours, seven days a week. As of September 2018, the neighborhood was one of the most densely populated slums in Entebbe Municipality.

Many of the residents are not formally employed, with an attendant high crime rate. Crimes include prostitution, use of illicit drugs and excessive alcohol consumption. Nakiwogo Police Station is responsible for law-enforcement in the neighborhood.

In an effort to curb the high crime rate, the area leaders have instituted a mandatory registration requirement for all residents in the neighborhood, in a "know-your-neighbor" effort.

Population
In 2018, the population of the Lugonjo neighborhood was estimated at approximately 40,000 people.

Points of interest
These are some of the points of interest in or near Lugonjo:
(a) Nakayiza's Pub, a nightclub, that s patronized by many of the residents. (b) Columbia, an establishment where the local police, has been able to intercept prostitution and marijuana sales.

See also
 Abayita Ababiri

References

External links
  Entebbe man wakes up to dead lover in bed

Entebbe
Populated places in Central Region, Uganda
Cities in the Great Rift Valley
Wakiso District